"Too High to Fly" is a song by American heavy metal band Dokken, released in 1995 on the album Dysfunctional. The song peaked at number 29 on the Hot Mainstream Rock Tracks chart in the United States.

With new material from albums the band are touring behind not included, this is the only song by the band released after 1988 that is still performed live in concert.

References

Dokken songs
1995 songs
1995 singles
Songs written by Don Dokken
Songs written by George Lynch (musician)
Columbia Records singles